The 1893 Washington football team was an American football team that represented the University of Washington during the 1893 college football season In its second season under W. B. Goodwin, the Washington team compiled a 1–3–1 record and was outscored by its opponents by a combined total of 86 to 18. D. A. Ford was the team captain.

Schedule

References

Washington
Washington Huskies football seasons
Washington football